Retroporcus was an extinct genus of even-toed ungulates that existed during the Miocene in Europe, the Indian subcontinent, and Turkey.

References

Prehistoric Suidae
Miocene mammals of Europe
Miocene mammals of Asia
Miocene even-toed ungulates
Prehistoric even-toed ungulate genera